State Route 671 (SR 671) is an east–west state highway in the southern portion of Ohio. Its eastern terminus is at U.S. Route 50 (US 50) in the unincorporated community of Ratcliffburg.

Route description
Starting from a T-intersection with SR 327 in Eagle Township just inside of the Ross-Vinton county line, where SR 327 forms the western and northern legs of the intersection, SR 671 heads easterly across the Salt Creek and through grassland through the Dixon Mill Road intersection, where it then turns to the southeast into primarily forested terrain. The highway passes back-to-back T-intersections with two unpaved roads, Fout Road and State Ford Road, while continuing to trend southeasterly through the woods to the point where it comes to an end in the Harrison Township hamlet of Ratcliffburg at a T-intersection with US 50.

History
SR 671 was originally designated in 1939 along the routing that it currently occupies between SR 327 and US 50. No major changes have taken place to the highway since it was certified.

Major intersections

References

External links

671
Transportation in Vinton County, Ohio